Xóchitl (Mexican ) is the Hispanicized version of "xōchitl," the Nahuatl word for flower is a given name that is somewhat common in Mexico and among Chicana/os for girls. The name has been a common Nahuatl name among Nahuas for hundreds of years. It was recorded on an early-16th century census of the Aztec people in the villages of Huitzillan and Quauchichinollan, where it was found to be the tenth most common name among boys. In a 1590 census, the boys name Xōchipepe (flower gatherer) was recorded, as well as the girls names of Ēlōxōchitl (magnolia), Miyāoaxōchitl (maize tassel flower), and Xīlōxōch (calliandra), which all draw from Xochitl.

People 
Xochitl, Toltec queen and wife of Tecpancaltzin Iztaccaltzin
Xochitl Castañeda, founding director of the Health Initiative of the Americas
Xochitl Dominguez Benetton (born 1980), Mexican scientist
Xóchitl Escobedo (born 1968), a retired female tennis player from Mexico
Xochitl Gomez (born 2006), an American actress
Xochitl Gonzalez (born 1977), American writer and producer
Xóchitl Hamada (born 1970), a semi-retired Mexican-Japanese professional wrestler
Xóchitl Montes de Oca (born 1971), a Mexican politician
Xóchitl Sánchez (born 1973), a Mexican luchadora known by the ring name Tiffany
Xochitl Torres Small (born 1984), American water attorney who represented New Mexico's 2nd congressional district
Xóchitl Ugarte (born 1979), a Mexican voice actress

See also 

 Xochitla ("place of flowers"), park in Tepotzotlán, State of Mexico, Greater Mexico City

References

Feminine given names
Spanish feminine given names